Settle Rural District was an administrative district in the West Riding of Yorkshire, England. The rural district was named after the town of Settle and included the civil parishes of Bentham, Clapham cum Newby, Malham, Settle, Stainforth, Austwick, Giggleswick, Ingleton and Horton.

The rural district was disbanded in local government reorganisation in 1974 and transferred to the Craven district of North Yorkshire.

References

External links
 Boundary map

   

Rural districts of the West Riding of Yorkshire